Bob Ridgley is a Canadian politician. He represented the district of St. John's North in the Newfoundland and Labrador House of Assembly as a member of the Progressive Conservative Party from 2003 to 2011. He was defeated in the 2011 provincial election.

References

External links
Bob Ridgley's PC Party biography

Progressive Conservative Party of Newfoundland and Labrador MHAs
Living people
Businesspeople from St. John's, Newfoundland and Labrador
Politicians from St. John's, Newfoundland and Labrador
21st-century Canadian politicians
Year of birth missing (living people)
Place of birth missing (living people)